The Peavey Reactor is a solid body electric guitar of the telecaster type, manufactured between 1993 and 1999 and made in the US by Peavey. All models have a bolt-on neck, 22 frets, a 12” (305 mm) fingerboard radius, and a 25½ “ (648 mm) scale. The standard Reactor has a rock maple neck, a poplar body, and solid color paint job. The pickup and knob configuration, bridge, and overall body shape bears resemblance to the bolt-on S-S Fender Telecaster.

Electronics

The pickup configuration is S-S
The guitar has one master volume control, one master tone control, in addition to a 3-way pickup selector.

See also
 List of Peavey guitars

References

Further reading
 United States Patent No. 4237944A Google patents

Peavey electric guitars